The Asia One Center (アジアワンセンター) is a  tall skyscraper located at Center of Rokkō Island, Kobe City, Japan. The 31-storey building was previously named Procter and Gamble Technical Center and was the Asia headquarters of Procter and Gamble Group. Asia One Center is one of top ten skyscrapers and a landmark building of Kobe City.

The building is split into several sections: At lobby level, it has a world class seminar room, the forth to eleventh floors are a research and development center, and the top section is the business offices.

The nearby train station, two luxury hotels at next door (Kobe Bay Sheraton and Hotel Plaza Kobe) and limousine bus directly to Kansai Airport provide the ultimate convenience for this building.  The surroundings of Asia One Center also include shopping malls, high-end residential towers, international schools, university, hospital and local parks.

References

External links
 Official site 

Skyscraper office buildings in Japan
Buildings and structures in Kobe
1993 establishments in Japan
Office buildings completed in 1993